Atherton Peak is a peak rising to about  east of Fortuna Bay, South Georgia. It was charted by Discovery Investigations, 1929–30, and named after Noel Atherton, cartographer in the Admiralty Hydrographic Office at the time, later chief Civil Hydrographic Officer, 1951–62.

References

 

Mountains and hills of South Georgia